Bernard Allen Weisberger (born August 15, 1922) is an American historian. Weisberger taught American history at several universities including the University of Chicago, Wayne State University, and the University of Rochester, where he was chair of the department. He has written more than a dozen books and worked on documentaries with Bill Moyers and Ken Burns. His article "The Dark and Bloody Ground of Reconstruction Historiography," which received the Charles Ramsdell Prize is considered a standard in the study of the Reconstruction period.

He was a contributing editor of American Heritage, where which he was a columnist for ten years. Weisberger was also a member of the National Hillel Commission and a participant in the civil rights movement.

He graduated from Columbia University in 1943 and received his PhD from University of Chicago.

Selected books
His books include:
 The La Follettes of Wisconsin: Love and Politics in Progressive America (University of Wisconsin Press, 1994)
 America Afire: Adams, Jefferson, and the Revolutionary Election of 1800 (Morrow, 2000)
 When Chicago Ruled Baseball: The Cubs-White Sox World series of 1906 (Harper Collins, 2006).

References

External links

1922 births
Living people
21st-century American male writers
Writers from New York (state)
American male non-fiction writers
University of Chicago faculty
University of Rochester faculty
Columbia College (New York) alumni
University of Chicago alumni
Wayne State University faculty
American magazine editors
20th-century American historians
21st-century American historians